Mary Elizabeth Delahunty (born 7 June 1951) is an Australian journalist and politician with the Labor Party.

Early life
Delahunty was born in the Victorian town of Murtoa and educated at Loreto College in Ballarat. She earned a Bachelor of Arts in Political Science from La Trobe University.

Media career
Delahunty was a news journalist for the ABC and Network Ten from 1975 to 1996. She appeared in news and current affairs programs such as Four Corners and The 7.30 Report. She received a Gold Walkley award for the story Aiding and Abetting which was shown and produced by Four Corners in 1983.

Aiding and Abetting was about the improper use of Australian aid money in the Philippines. In the late 1980s, Delahunty, then the chief newsreader for the ABC in Victoria, was parodied by comedian Jean Kittson on The Big Gig, where Kittson portrayed a snobbish, acid-tongued announcer called Veronica Glenhuntly (whose surname was taken from that of the elite Melbourne suburb). Delahunty was the weeknight presenter of ABC News Victoria from 1986 until 1990. She was replaced by Sue McIntosh.

Political career
Delahunty was elected to the seat of Northcote in the Victorian Legislative Assembly at a 1998 by-election. Her maiden speech was about the implications of the Fitzgerald report for Victoria, especially in regard to police corruption.

Delahunty was Minister for Education from 1999–2002, during the term of the first Bracks Government. She was the Minister for the Arts from 1999–2006, Minister for Women's Affairs from 2002–06, and Minister for Planning from 2002–05. As Minister for Planning, she was responsible for the media presentation of Melbourne 2030.

As Minister for Planning, Delahunty was criticized for the altering of the annual Surveyor-General's Report 2002–03, submitted by the Surveyor-General of Victoria, Keith Clifford Bell.  The acting Victorian Ombudsman announced in January 2004 that he would “investigate why the former Surveyor-General's final annual report was substantially altered before being tabled in State Parliament last November”  He also announced he would investigate the misuse of the Surveyor-General’s electronic signature by the Department of Sustainability and Environment.  The Auditor-General confirmed it would keep a watching brief over the investigations.  It was also confirmed that the government ignored the advice of the office of the Victorian Government Solicitor “to not interfere with the report”.  Bell, himself had confirmed that the report had been altered.  The complaint to the Ombudsman leading to the investigation had come from the then Opposition planning spokesman Ted Baillieu  Efforts to alter or block Bell’s reports, 1999-01 and 2000–01, had also occurred under the former Minister Sherryl Garbutt.  Garbutt had made claims the reports were inaccurate, but were subsequently tabled without any alteration.

The Ombudsman's  investigation found substantial sections altered after Bell had finished his term as Surveyor-General.  It also found that Bell's signature was assigned to the Annual Report 2002-03 of the Surveyors Board of Victoria, without his knowledge or consent.  The government was directed to apologize to Bell. Shadow Planning Minister, Ted Baillieu, in his statement to the Parliament on 9 April 2003 reported on the political interference at multiple levels, including the Planning Minister, in the performance of the responsibilities of the Surveyor-General. Bell was acknowledged as a competent, highly respected public servant and he was held in the highest esteem by both the surveying profession and the business sector. In a further statement to Parliament on 4 May 2005, Baillieu commented on the "doctoring" of Bell's report, which had been done at the Minister's direction. Baillieu further cited the Ombudsman's findings that the altering of the report was inappropriate and there were concerns regarding the adequacy of the investigations.  It was claimed that then Planning Minister Delahunty had misled the Parliament. The tabled report bears the hand-written note signed by Bell's successor: “Amended by the direction of the Minister. John E.Tulloch Surveyor General of Victoria 19/4/2005”.

Previously, in 2002, the Auditor-General reviewed the functions and responsibilities of the Surveyor-General and agreed with reports submitted by Bell. The Auditor-General identified the interference by Land Victoria in the performance of the Surveyor-General's responsibilities, including the wrongful transfer of the Surveyor-General's responsibilities to business units of Land Victoria outside of the Office of Surveyor-General. He confirmed that such responsibilities cannot be transferred without legislative mandate. The Auditor-General found that the transfer of the functions of the Surveyor-General had seen them delivered unsatisfactorily and did not meet the obligations of the legislation. The Opposition blamed Delahunty and her predecessor Sherryl Garbutt, for extreme political interference in the performance of the Surveyor-General's responsibilities. Such interference included: attempts to block or alter annual reports from Bell; affix his electronic signature without his knowledge or permission; threats and intimidation by the former Executive Director of Land Victoria Elizabeth O'Keeffe; hiring of private investigators to investigate Bell and his office; and efforts to interfere with his review of State electoral boundaries in his capacity as a Electoral Boundaries Commissioner.  Notably, Bell, who served as the Surveyor-General 1999-2003, was later to be officially recognized for his professional service and contributions, including: (1) a Doctorate of Applied Science Honoris Causa, RMIT University in 2003; (ii) a Lifetime Achievement Award, The University of Melbourne in 2021; and (3) appointed as a Member of the Order of Australia in the 2022 Queen's Birthday Honours (Australia). 

In January 2005 Bracks dumped Delahunty as Planning Minister. Rob Hulls replaced Delahunty in what the media reported as an "increasingly controversial" ministerial portfolio.  Delahunty commented in the media that in late February 2005 "she picked up The Sunday Age to read that members of the ruling Right faction of the ALP wanted her out of her safe seat." In October 2006, Delahunty advised that she would not contest the November 2006 election due to health and family reasons.

Personal life
Delahunty is the sister of Victorian National Party MP, Hugh Delahunty, who is also a former Victorian Football League player, as is another brother, Michael. Her husband of 22 years, the journalist Jock Rankin, died in 2002. She has two children, Nicholas and Olivia. She was a guest on Life Matters (ABC Radio National, 26 August 2010) on such topics as grief, parenting, civic participation and public life, and her memoir, Public Life, Private Grief.

Bibliography

Non-fiction

Critical studies and reviews of Delahunty's work
 Review of Gravity.

References

1951 births
ABC News (Australia) presenters
Australian television journalists
Australian Labor Party members of the Parliament of Victoria
Australian people of Irish descent
Women members of the Victorian Legislative Assembly
Delegates to the Australian Constitutional Convention 1998
20th-century Australian politicians
Walkley Award winners
Living people
Politicians from Melbourne
Journalists from Melbourne
Members of the Victorian Legislative Assembly
Victorian Ministers for Women
21st-century Australian politicians
21st-century Australian women politicians
20th-century Australian women politicians
Australian women television journalists
National Library of Australia Council members
People educated at Loreto College, Victoria
La Trobe University alumni